The Dumești is a left tributary of the Sârbi in Romania. It flows into the Sârbi near the village Sârbi.

References

Rivers of Romania
Rivers of Hunedoara County